Pittsburgh is an album by American jazz pianist Ahmad Jamal featuring performances recorded in 1989 and released on the Atlantic label.

Critical reception
The Allmusic review stated "This CD has captured both the character and the shaping hand of Jamal and the distinct sound of Evans, and they are a perfect match in this at-times-exquisite piece of work".

Track listing
All compositions by Ahmad Jamal unless noted.
 "Pittsburgh" – 7:03   
 "Bellows" – 8:50   
 "Mellowdrama" (Jimmy Heath) – 6:38   
 "Foolish Ways" – 3:35   
 "Divertimento" – 5:18   
 "Cycles" – 8:08   
 "Fly Away" – 7:25   
 "Apple Avenue" – 5:33

Personnel
Ahmad Jamal – piano
James Cammack – bass
David Bowler – drums 
Richard Evans – arranger

References 

Atlantic Records albums
Ahmad Jamal albums
1989 albums